The 1997 Bausch & Lomb Championships was a women's tennis tournament played on outdoor clay courts at the Amelia Island Plantation on Amelia Island, Florida in the United States that was part of Tier II of the 1997 WTA Tour. It was the 18th edition of the tournament and was held from April 7 through April 13, 1997.

Finals

Singles

 Lindsay Davenport defeated  Mary Pierce 6–2, 6–3
 It was Davenport's 5th title of the year and the 23rd of her career.

Doubles

 Lindsay Davenport /  Jana Novotná defeated  Nicole Arendt /  Manon Bollegraf 6–3, 6–0
It was Davenport's 6th title of the year and the 24th of her career. It was Novotná's 2nd title of the year and the 78th of her career.

External links
 ITF tournament edition details 

Bausch and Lomb Championships
Amelia Island Championships
Bausch & Lomb Championships
Bausch & Lomb Championships
Bausch & Lomb Championships